The Politically Incorrect Guide to Science is a 2005 book by conservative journalist Tom Bethell, in which the author makes questionable and highly politicized claims  on subjects such as HIV/AIDS, intelligent design, and the relationship between science and Christianity. It was published by Regnery Publishing.

The book received positive reviews from conservatives and was widely criticized by scientists and book reviewers, with Publishers Weekly summarizing it thus: "In the end, this book is unlikely to sway readers who aren't already in Bethell's ideological camp, as any points worthy of discussion get lost in the glut of unsourced claims".

The Glasgow Daily Times described Bethell as "an ultra-conservative, right-wing religious zealot [...] who has been trying to convince anyone who has been foolish enough to listen for the last 30 years that nothing of science should be believed".

Reception
The book received positive reviews from William A. Rusher in The MetroWest Daily News, a mixed review from Carl Grant in New Oxford Review, and negative reviews from the journalist Chris Mooney in  Skeptical Inquirer and Lisa Simpson Strange in the Glasgow Daily Times.

Rusher credited Bethell with showing that the misuse of science to reinforce political viewpoints is a major political problem and with exposing "liberal myths" such as global warming and evolution (both of which are robustly supported by the scientific consensus), as well as beliefs about the dangers of nuclear power and DDT.

Grant credited Bethell with making important criticisms of the way in which science is done. He agreed with Bethell that scientists often have biases and conflicts of interest, and also expressed agreement with many of Bethell's views on the relationship of religion and science, writing that the evidence for naturalistic evolution was "underwhelming" and that, "Much evolutionary theory is only a series of ad hoc explanations to cover the poor fit between Darwin’s theory and actual fact." However, he criticized Bethell for his dismissal of theistic evolution, for sometimes failing to "provide reference where the context requires them", such as in his discussions of the AIDS epidemic and the Catholic Church's treatment of Galileo Galilei, and for sometimes overstating his case, or alternately conceding too much to his opponents. Overall, he concluded that the book was "moderately useful".

Mooney argued that Bethell "misrepresents the state of scientific knowledge on issues ranging from global warming to the vulnerability of endangered species to evolution". He observed that Bethell's book was "getting plenty of attention" and selling well, that The Heritage Foundation had sponsored an event to promote it, and that it was "likely to be read by a lot of people". He considered its publication "a highly significant development", since it took the "war on scientific knowledge from the political right" in the United States "to a new level of intensity" and exposed the "anti-science sentiments" of many conservative Republicans. He wrote that Bethell "provides a useful service" by presenting "discredited arguments" often used to undermine well-established scientific conclusions. He accused Bethell of "compiling scientific-sounding arguments to bolster a political conclusion", misrepresenting some sources, presenting problematic "general science policy arguments", misguidedly encouraging journalists to criticize science, wrongly dismissing scientific consensus, and "whipping up resentment of the scientific community among rank-and-file political conservatives." He found the book "a very saddening and depressing read."

Strange described the book as a "tome of utter disinformation" and Bethell as "an ultra-conservative, right-wing religious zealot" who "takes the research actual scientists have worked on for years and either twists the findings to fit his own narrow-minded agenda" or "simply announces to the world that the efforts of dedicated, trained men and women in the fields of medicine, chemistry, molecular biology, genetics, etc." are nothing but "junk science." She also charged Bethell with producing "reams of type about subjects of which he has no clear understanding" and of making "no effort to educate himself on matters pertaining to actual scientific method and study." She also characterized Bethell's work as "junk".

References

Bibliography
Books

 

Journals

  
  
  

Online articles

 
 
 

2005 non-fiction books
American non-fiction books
Books by Tom Bethell
English-language books
HIV/AIDS denialist books
Politically Incorrect Guides
Popular science books
Regnery Publishing books